Chah Nizam Wala, also known as Thaheem Lane, is a small suburb located in Bosan, Multan District, Pakistan. Its founder was Malik Nizam khan Thaheem. It has an area of 360 kanals.

The suburb's main ethnic group is Thaheem also known as Bani Tamim a Muslim group of Arabic origin which is believed to have come to the Punjab and Sindh
in the 12th century.

Chah Nizam Wala is in the middle of two roads; its link road is connected to Nawabpur Road and Gillani Road both are linked to Northern Bypass Multan and further are linked to MDA Road and Bosan Road Multan. This residential area is part of former Prime Minister Yousaf Raza Gillani electoral pool.

Geo-graphics 
It is located opposite to Royal Residency Multan and Fida Avenue Multan off Nawab Pur Road Multan. It has two entry gates one from Nawabpur Road Multan and onother from Ginlliani road from canal side. It has market with groceries and bakery items known as Thaheem Market. Its location is prime to Northern Bypass Multan.
Some of nearby urban suburbs include 
Gulgasht Colony Multan, 
Wapda Town Multan,
Royal Orchard Multan and 
Model Town Multan.

Roads and Infrastructure
This suburb is very well planned and developed. It has a metal road linking to two main roads i.e. Nawapur Road, Multan and Gillani Road. Gas, telephone, fiber optics, and internet broadband facilities are available. Multan Bypass chowk is just 300 meters away from here. Nishat college of science, Royal International School and Zakariya Public School are located within just 1 km from here. Bahauddin Zakariya University is just at 9 minutes drive from here.
Moreover it is a secure gated community.

Climate
Climate in summer is hot and humid. Spring season is very pleasant. Winter brings nice changes in the weather in this area. Monsoon is always full of rains. Overall the climate is very good to live. The suburb is surrounded by green trees all around which makes the weather even more attractive and pleasant.

Population
Total population of this small suburb is around 5,000 people. Majority of them is youth. Half of the population consists of females. They are healthy and energetic in daily activities of the life. Youth population plays a key role in the political activities in the area here.

References

External links
http://villages.ws/pakistan/Nizamwala
Chah Nizam Walla Multan on Google Map

Populated places in Multan District